Darya Astakhova and Ekaterina Reyngold won the title, defeating Cristina Dinu and Nika Radišić in the final, 3–6, 6–2, [10–8].

Cristina Dinu and Valeriya Strakhova were the defending champions but Strakhova chose not to participate. Dinu partnered alongside Nika Radišić, but lost in the final.

Seeds

Draw

Draw

References

External Links
Main Draw

Vrnjačka Banja Open - Doubles